Speaker of the Council of Representatives of Iraq is the presiding officer of that legislature. The position was preceded by the Speaker of the National Assembly of Iraq, up to the Iraq War.

Since 15 September 2018, Mohamed al-Halbousi serves as the speaker.

Keys

Speakers

Presidents of Senate of Iraq
The upper house from 1925 to 1958, see Senate of Iraq

Presidents of Chamber of Deputies of Iraq
The lower house from 1925 to 1958, see Chamber of Deputies of Iraq

See also
President of Iraq
List of presidents of Iraq
Vice President of Iraq
Prime Minister of Iraq
List of prime ministers of Iraq
Ministry of Foreign Affairs (Iraq)

References

Politics of Iraq
Iraq, Council of Representatives
Speakers of the Council of Representatives of Iraq
Speakers